Plekhanovo is the name of several rural localities in Russia:
Plekhanovo, Lipetsk Oblast, a selo in Plekhanovsky Selsoviet of Gryazinsky District in Lipetsk Oblast; 
Plekhanovo, Novosibirsk Oblast, a village in Dovolensky District of Novosibirsk Oblast
Plekhanovo, Oryol Oblast, a village in Uzkinsky Selsoviet of Znamensky District in Oryol Oblast
Plekhanovo, Kungursky District, Perm Krai, a selo in Kungursky District of Perm Krai
Plekhanovo, Usolsky District, Perm Krai, a village in Usolsky District of Perm Krai
Plekhanovo, Smolensk Oblast, a village in Ashkovskoye Rural Settlement of Gagarinsky District in Smolensk Oblast
Plekhanovo, Kireyevsky District, Tula Oblast, a village in Podosinovsky Rural Okrug of Kireyevsky District in Tula Oblast
Plekhanovo, Leninsky District, Tula Oblast, a settlement in Khrushchevsky Rural Okrug of Leninsky District in Tula Oblast
Plekhanovo, Tver Oblast, a village in Molodotudskoye Rural Settlement of Oleninsky District in Tver Oblast
Plekhanovo, Tyumen Oblast, a selo in Plekhanovsky Rural Okrug of Yarkovsky District in Tyumen Oblast